Midian (Mīḏyān ; ; , Madiam) is a geographical place mentioned in the Hebrew Bible and Quran. William G. Dever states that biblical Midian was in the "northwest Arabian Peninsula, on the east shore of the Gulf of Aqaba on the Red Sea", an area which he notes was "never extensively settled until the 8th–7th century B.C."

According to the Book of Genesis, the Midianites were the descendants of Midian, who was a son of Abraham and his wife Keturah: "Abraham took a wife, and her name was Keturah. And she bare him Zimran, and Jokshan, and Medan, and Midian, and Ishbak, and Shuah" (Genesis 25:1–2, King James Version).

Neither Midian's nor the Midianites' existence are attested in antiquity outside of Biblical sources.

Land or tribal league? 
Some scholars have suggested that the name "Midian" does not refer to geographic places or to a specific tribe, but to a confederation or "league" of tribes brought together as a collective for worship purposes. Paul Haupt first made this suggestion in 1909, describing Midian as a "cultic collective" or an amphictyony, meaning "an association of different tribes in the vicinity of a sanctuary". Elath, on the northern tip of the Gulf of Aqaba was suggested as the location of the first shrine, with a second sanctuary located at Kadesh.

Later writers have questioned the identified sanctuary-locations but supported the thesis of a Midianite league. George Mendenhall suggested that the Midianites were a non-Semitic confederate group, and William Dumbrell maintained the same case:

Religion 

It is uncertain which deities the Midianites worshipped. Through their apparent religio-political connection with the Moabites they are thought to have worshipped a multitude, including Baal-peor and the Queen of Heaven, Ashteroth. According to Karel van der Toorn, "By the 14th century BC, groups of Edomites and Midianites worshipped Yahweh as their god;" this conclusion is based on identification between Midianites and the Shasu.

An Egyptian temple of Hathor at Timna continued to be used during the Midianite occupation of the site (terminal Late Bronze Age / Early Iron Age); the Midianites transformed the Hathor mining temple into a desert tent-shrine. In addition to the discovery of post-holes, large quantities of red and yellow decayed cloth with beads woven into it, along with numerous copper rings/wire used to suspend the curtains, were found all along two walls of the shrine. Beno Rothenberg, the excavator of the site, suggested that the Midianites were making offerings to Hathor, especially since a large number of Midianite votive vessels (25%) were discovered in the shrine. However, whether Hathor or some other deity was the object of devotion during this period is difficult to ascertain. A small bronze snake with gilded head was also discovered in the naos of the Timna mining shrine, along with a hoard of metal objects that included a small bronze figurine of a bearded male god, which according to Rothenberg was Midianite in origin. Michael Homan observes that the Midianite tent-shrine at Timna is one of the closest parallels to the biblical Tabernacle.

In religious scripture

In the Bible 

Midian was the son of Abraham. Abraham's great grandson Joseph, after being thrown into a pit by his brothers, was sold to either Midianites or Ishmaelites.

Moses spent 40 years in voluntary exile in Midian after killing an Egyptian. There, he married Zipporah, the daughter of Midianite priest Jethro (also known as Reuel). Jethro advised Moses on establishing a system of delegated legal decision-making. Moses asked Hobab, the son of Reuel, to accompany the Israelites travelling towards the promised land because of his local knowledge, but Hobab preferred to return to his homeland.

During the Baal-Peor episode, when Moabite women seduced Israelite men, Zimri, the son of a Simeonite chief, got involved with a Midianite woman called Cozbi. The couple were speared by Phinehas. War against Midian followed. Numbers 31 reports that all but the virgin females were slain, and their cities burned to the ground. Some commentators, for example the Pulpit Commentary and Gill's Exposition of the Bible, have noted that God's command focused on attacking the Midianites and not the Moabites, and similarly Moses in Deuteronomy directed that the Israelites should not harass the Moabites. A modern-day movement, the Phineas Priesthood, has interpreted this story as a prohibition against miscegenation, despite the Midianites being closely related to the Israelites as descendants of Abraham, and Moses being married to a Midianite.

During the time of the Judges, Israel was oppressed by Midian for seven years until Gideon defeated Midian's armies. Isaiah speaks of camels from Midian and Ephah coming to "cover your land", along with the gold and frankincense from Sheba. This passage, taken by the Gospel of Matthew as a foreshadowing of the Magi's gifts to the infant Jesus, has been incorporated into the Christmas liturgy.

In the Quran 
The people of Midian are mentioned extensively in the Quran. The word 'Madyan' appears 10 times in it. The people are also called .

The lands of Midian are mentioned in sura Al-Qasas (The Stories), verses 20-28, of the Quran as the place where Moses escaped upon learning of the Pharaoh conspiring to kill him.

Surah 9 (Al-Tawbah), verse 70 says "Has not the story reached them of those before them? – The people of Nūḥ (Noah), ʿĀd and Thamud, the people of Ibrahim (Abraham), the dwellers [literally, comrades] of Madyan (Midian) and the cities overthrown [i.e. the people to whom Lūt (Lot) preached], to them came their Messengers with clear proofs. So it was not Allah who wronged them, but they used to wrong themselves."

In Surah 7 (Al-ʾAʿrāf), Madyan is mentioned as one of several peoples who were warned by prophets to repent lest judgment fall on them. The story of Madyan is the last, coming after that of Lot preaching to his people (referring to the destruction of the Cities of the Plain). Madyan was warned by the prophet Shuʿaib to repent of practicing polytheism, using false weights and measures and lying in wait along the road. But they rejected Shuʿayb, and consequently were destroyed by a tremor (rajfa, v. 91). Abdullah Yusuf Ali in his commentary (1934) writes, "The fate of the Madyan people is described in the same terms as that of the Thamūd in verse 78 above. An earthquake seized them by night, and they were buried in their own homes, no longer to vex Allah's earth. But a supplementary detail is mentioned in [Quran] 26:189, 'the punishment of a day of overshadowing gloom,' which may be understood to mean a shower of ashes and cinders accompanying a volcanic eruption. Thus a day of terror drove them into their homes, and the earthquake finished them." A number of scholars have proposed that the biblical description of devouring fire on Mount Sinai refers to an erupting volcano in the land of biblical Midian identified as Hala-'l Badr in northwestern Saudi Arabia.

Pottery 
Midianite pottery, also called Qurayyah Painted Ware (QPW), is found at numerous sites stretching from the southern Levant to NW Saudi Arabia, the Hejaz; Qurayyah in NW Saudi Arabia is thought to be its original location of manufacture. The pottery is bichrome / polychrome style and it dates as early as the 13th century BC; its many geometric, human, and animal motifs are painted in browns and dark reds on a pinkish-tan slip. "Midianite" pottery is found in its largest quantities at metallurgical sites in the southern Levant, especially Timna. Because of the Mycenaean motifs on Midianite pottery, some scholars including George Mendenhall, Peter Parr, and Beno Rothenberg have suggested that the Midianites were originally Sea Peoples who migrated from the Aegean region and imposed themselves on a pre-existing Semitic stratum. The question of the origin of the Midianites still remains open.

Mountains 

The Midian Mountains are a mountain range in northwestern Saudi Arabia. They are considered to be either contiguous with the Hijaz Mountains to the south, or a part of them. The Hijaz are themselves treated as part of the Sarawat range, sensu lato.

See also 
 ʿĀd
 Balak
 Eglon
 Ishmaelites
 Kedar
 History of ancient Israel and Judah
 The Bible and history
 Midian war
 Sodom and Gomorrah
 Abarim, Jordanian mountains to the north
 Biblical Mount Sinai

Notes

References

Sources 

 Clines, David and John Sawyer, eds. "Midian, Moab and Edom: The History and Archaeology of Late Bronze and Iron Age Jordan and North-West Arabia". Journal for the Study of the Old Testament, Supplement Series, No. 24. Sheffield Academic Press, 1983.

 , which cites to:
 Archaeology of Timna
 Another Timna archaeology site
 Richard Burton's account of his travels in "The Land of Midian"
 Spring of Harod – Ma'ayan Harod
 THE EXODUS EXPLORED—Moses in Midian (YouTube)
 جبال مدين (Arabic Wiki)